Kjell Bloch Sandved (October 20, 1922 – December 20, 2015) was a Norwegian born publisher, author, lecturer and nature photographer, most known for his Butterfly Alphabet which contains pictures of Butterfly Wings resembling all the 26 letters in the latin alphabet and the arabic numerals 0 to 9.

Work in the United States 
In 1960 he emigrated from Norway to United States, and from then he worked in National Museum of Natural History for the Smithsonian Institution as an author and lecturer.  During his 32 year career there, Kjell Sandved has filmed penguins and seals in Antarctica, marine life and coral reefs in the Caribbean and Pacific, excavations of Early Bronze-Age Man at the Dead Sea, social behavior of orangutans in Kalimantan, and the world's largest flower, the Rafflesia Arnoldi, in Sumatra. He lectured with the Smithsonian Associates at schools and colleges around the United States on animal behavior and nature photography.

Reception
Sandved's book The world of music is described by The Independent'''s Robert Fisk as "... a weighty heart attack of a book", and his book Leaves: The Formation, Characteristics, and Uses of Hundreds of Leaves Found in All Parts of the World is described by Tibor Fuchs as "Stunning photos and informative text about all kinds of leaves, including many that houseplant lovers have in their homes." In the City Room blog at New York Times'' written by the staff.

Published work 
Kjell B. Sandved has published two encyclopedias and co-edited nine books.

References

External links 
 Butterfly Alphabet Official site
 
Sandved Photograph Collection
 

1922 births
Nature photographers
American photographers
American nature writers
American male non-fiction writers
Smithsonian Institution people
2015 deaths
Norwegian emigrants to the United States